The Pteridales were an order of ferns that have their sori in linear strips under the edge of the leaf tissue, usually with the edge of the lamina reflexed over.

This order was reduced the family Pteridaceae under the Smith classification of 2006, a position maintained in the Pteridophyte Phylogeny Group classification of 2016 (PPG I).

References

 Schuettpelz, Eric, Harald Schneider, Layne Huiet, Michael D. Windham, Kathleen M. Pryer. "A molecular phylogeny of the fern family Pteridaceae: Assessing overall relationships and the affinities of previously unsampled genera." Molecular Phylogenetics and Evolution, 44: 1172–1185. 2007: https://web.archive.org/web/20080820183832/http://www.pryerlab.net/publication/fichier1047.pdf

External links

 01
Historically recognized plant orders